Learn How to Read and Write, Son is a 1981 Greek comedy film directed by Thodoros Maragos and starring Vasilis Diamantopoulos, Nikos Kalogeropoulos, Kostas Tsakonas and Anna Mantzourani.

Plot

The story is set in a mountain village in Arcadia (the movie was filmed in Stemnitsa, Dimitsana and the surrounding areas) shortly after the Metapolitefsi (the fall of the military junta of 1967–74). The unveiling of a monument to those who died during the Occupation (World War II) stirs up the village, because the name of a communist partisan who was killed was omitted. Periklis (V. Diamantopoulos), a conservative high school teacher, comes to clash with his wife and his two sons over whether Chrysanthi and her family have a right to put a wreath in memory of the partisan.

Awards
The film won three awards at the 1981 Thessaloniki Film Festival:

Cast

Vasilis Diamantopoulos ..... Pericles Papachristoforos
Anna Mantzourani ..... Elpida Papachristoforou
Kostas Tsakonas ..... Demosthenes Papachristoforos
Nikos Kalogeropoulos ..... Socrates Papachristoforos
Christos Kalavrouzos ..... Kanavos
Dimos Avdeliodis .....
Giorgos Vrasivanopoulos

References

External links

1981 films
1980s Greek-language films
1981 comedy films
Greek comedy films